Closers: Side Blacklambs is an aeni based on South Korean online game Closers.

Episodes

See also 
 Aeni

References

External links
 
 

South Korean animated television series
South Korean web series
2018 works
2018 in South Korea
2018 in animation
Korean-language works
Works based on video games
Animated web series